Falls Church normally refers to the city of Falls Church, Virginia.

It may also refer to:
West Falls Church, Virginia, a census-designated place
The Falls Church, the historic Episcopal church for which Falls Church is named
The Falls Church (Anglican), an Anglican parish which broke off from the Episcopal Church in 2006
East Falls Church station, a station in the Washington Metro system
West Falls Church station, a station in the Washington Metro system
Falls Church High School, a high school in West Falls Church